Chamaraja Wodeyar IV (25 July 1507 – 9 November 1576) was the seventh maharaja of the Kingdom of Mysore. He was youngest son of Chamaraja Wodeyar III, the fifth raja of Mysore.  He took over the kingdom at the age of 65 after his older brother's death in 1572 and ruled for four years until 1576.

As king 
He was struck by a lightning and was reduced to baldness, thereafter nicknamed Bola (the bald).

In 1572, he succeeded on the death of his elder brother Timmaraja Wodeyar II. Although Timmaraja Wodeyar II had declared Mysore Kingdom independent of the Vijayanagara Empire, it was not ratified. Chamaraja Wodeyar IV strongly opposed Vijayanagara. He immediately expelled the Vijayanagar envoys and revenue collectors from Mysore Kingdom. Although he had to retain a small delegation of Vijayanagara in Srirangapattana, he had all other traces of Vijayanagara high command removed throughout his kingdom.

Major acquisition: Bangalore town 
Kempe Gowda I had built a town out of an uninhabited mass of land at nearly the time Chamaraja Wodeyar IV was born. He had grown up listening to the valorous stories of Kempe Gowda I and his Bangalore town. Mysore Kingdom has made quite considerable expansion in the last 173 years and had grown into a formidable kingdom. Chamaraja Wodeyar IV led an expedition after Kempe Gowda's death in 1569. and acquired Bangalore.

On 9 November 1576, he died, and his nephew Chamaraja Wodeyar V succeeded him.

See also
 Bangalore town
 Wodeyar dynasty

External links
 Mysore Palace and the Wodeyar Dynasty

1507 births
1576 deaths
Kings of Mysore
Chamaraja IV
16th-century Indian monarchs